A bun is a type of bread roll, typically filled with savory fillings (for example hamburger). A bun may also refer to a  sweet cake in certain parts of the world. Though they come in many shapes and sizes, buns are most commonly round, and are generally hand-sized or smaller.

In the United Kingdom, the usage of the term differs greatly in different regions. In Southern England, a bun is a hand-sized sweet cake, while in the north of Ireland and Northern England, it is a small round of ordinary bread.

Buns are usually made from a dough of flour, milk, yeast and small amounts of sugar and/or butter. Sweet bun dough is distinguished from bread dough by being enriched with sugar, butter and sometimes egg. Common sweet varieties contain small fruit or nuts, topped with icing or caramel, and filled with jam or cream.

Chinese baozi, with savory or sweet fillings, are often referred to as "buns" in English.

List of buns

See also 

 Cheung Chau Bun Festival
 Chinese bakery products
 List of breads
 List of bread dishes
 List of cakes
 List of pastries
 List of sweet breads

References

External links
 

 
Quick breads
Sweet breads
Yeast breads